Stina Martini (born 7 February 1993 in Salzburg) is an Austrian former competitive pair skater. With partner Severin Kiefer, she is a three-time Austrian national champion.

Programs 
(with Kiefer)

Competitive highlights 
JGP: Junior Grand Prix

With Kiefer

References

External links

Navigation

Austrian female pair skaters
1993 births
Living people
Sportspeople from Salzburg